Aalden is a village in the Netherlands and it is part of the Coevorden municipality in Drenthe.

History 
Aalden developed in the Middle Ages on higher sand ground. The oldest part developed around a triangular village green without a church. It was first mentioned in 1332 as Alede. The etymology is unclear. Nowadays, it forms a single urban area with Zweeloo. In 1840, it was home to 116 people.

The Jantina Hellingmolen is a gristmill from 1891 and is still in service on a voluntary basis.

Gallery

References 

Coevorden
Populated places in Drenthe